Muharrem Shabani (born 1949) is a politician in Kosovo. He was a member of the Assembly of the Socialist Autonomous Province of Kosovo in 1989-90 and served as deputy speaker. In 1990, he was prominent among a group of Albanian delegates that supported Kosovo becoming a republic within Yugoslavia, and he played a key role in establishing a parallel assembly when the official parliament was shut down in July 1990. Shabani later served as the mayor of Vushtrri after the 1998-99 Kosovo War.

Early life and career
Shabani was born in Vučitrn (Albanian: Vushtrri) in what was then the Autonomous Region of Kosovo and Metohija in the People's Republic of Serbia, Federal People's Republic of Yugoslavia. He graduated from the University of Pristina Faculty of Law and was president of the municipal court in Vushtrri in the 1980s.

Politician
Shabani became an appointed member of the Kosovo assembly in June 1989, shortly after Serbia introduced a new constitution that restricted the province's autonomy. He served as the assembly's deputy speaker. In 1990, Albanian representatives in the assembly planned to introduce a motion to declare Kosovo as having the status of a republic within Yugoslavia. When the assembly was pre-emptively shut down, 114 Albanian delegates met separately to establish a parallel institution and declare Kosovo a republic. Shabani read the declaration of Kosovo's republic status; he later recounted that concerns were raised about the possibility of sniper fire from surrounding buildings. Because of worsening political conditions, he left Kosovo and lived in exile for most of the 1990s.

Mayor of Vushtrri and after
Shabani became politically active again in Vushtrri as a member of the Democratic League of Kosovo (Lidhja Demokratike e Kosovës, LDK) following the Kosovo War. He appeared in the seventh position on the party's electoral list in the 2000 Kosovan local elections and received a mandate in the municipal assembly when the list won twenty out of thirty-one mandates. He became mayor in late 2001 and was confirmed in office after the LDK won another local majority victory in the 2002 local elections. 

In 2004, Shabani promised representatives of the Vushtrri's Serb community that his government would reconstruct homes and religious sites destroyed in the 2004 unrest in Kosovo as soon as possible.

The LDK experienced a number of splits after the death of its founder Ibrahim Rugova in 2006; Shabani was among those who left the party. Kosovo introduced the direct election of mayors in the 2007 local elections, and Shabani sought re-election as the leader of his own "Democratic Union" group. He was defeated in the second round of voting by Bajram Mulaku of the Democratic Party of Kosovo (Partia Demokratike e Kosovës, PDK). He later joined the Alliance for the Future of Kosovo (Aleanca për Ardhmërinë e Kosovës, AAK) and ran for mayor under its banner in the 2009 local elections. He was again defeated by Mulaku in the second round.

Shabani appeared on the AAK's list for the Assembly of Kosovo in the 2010 parliamentary election but was not elected. In the 2013 local elections, he ran for mayor of Vushtrri with a dual endorsement from the AAK and the Democratic League of Dardania (Lidhja Demokratike e Dardanisë, LDD). Once again, he was defeated by Mulaku in the second round.

Shortly before the 2014 Kosovan parliamentary election, Shabani unexpectedly joined the PDK. He appeared in the seventieth position on the party's coalition list and was not elected as the list won thirty-seven seats. He was later a spokesperson for Kosovo's finance ministry.

Electoral record

Local

Notes

References

1949 births
Living people
Kosovo Albanians
People from Vushtrri
Members of the Assembly of the Socialist Autonomous Province of Kosovo
Members of the Assembly of Kosovo (1990s parallel institution)
Mayors of places in Serbia
Mayors of places in Kosovo
Democratic League of Kosovo politicians
Alliance for the Future of Kosovo politicians
Democratic Party of Kosovo politicians